Valentina Vasilyevna Sidorova (4 May 1954 – 9 June 2021) was a Soviet fencer. She won a gold medal in the women's team foil event at the 1976 Summer Olympics and a silver in the same event at the 1980 Summer Olympics.

References

External links
 
 Profile at Infosport.ru 
 Profile at Sport-strana.ru 

1954 births
2021 deaths
Russian female foil fencers
Soviet female foil fencers
Olympic fencers of the Soviet Union
Fencers at the 1976 Summer Olympics
Fencers at the 1980 Summer Olympics
Olympic gold medalists for the Soviet Union
Olympic silver medalists for the Soviet Union
Olympic medalists in fencing
Martial artists from Moscow
Medalists at the 1976 Summer Olympics
Medalists at the 1980 Summer Olympics